is a former Japanese professional basketball player who played for Akita Northern Happinets of the bj league in Japan.

Stats

|-
| align="left" | 2013-14
| align="left" | Tokyo CR
|41 ||2 ||12 ||27.7 ||19.0 ||70.0 ||1.0 ||1.2 ||0.5 ||0 ||1.8
|-
| align="left" | 2014-15
| align="left" | Akita
|38 ||4 ||9.3 ||38.2 ||16.7 ||61.9 ||1.0 ||1.6 ||0.3 ||0 ||1.7
|-
| align="left" |2015-16
| align="left" | Akita
|25 ||0 ||7.4 ||33.3 ||50.0 ||54.5 ||0.8 ||1.2 ||0.1 ||0 ||1.3
|-
| align="left" | Totals
| align="left" | 
|104 ||6 ||9.9 ||32.2 ||25.7 ||63.5 ||0.9 ||1.3 ||0.4 ||0 ||1.7
|-

Trivia
He is good at singing and sometimes serves as a prefectural anthem performer.

References

1990 births
Living people
Akita Northern Happinets players
Japanese men's basketball players
Sportspeople from Miyazaki Prefecture
Tokyo Cinq Rêves players